The Coppa Città di Sesto San Giovanni is an annual racewalking competition that takes place on 1 May in Sesto San Giovanni in Italy. It is an elite level event which features a men's and a women's race in the 20 kilometres race walk.

Organised by Geas Atletica, it has been part of the IAAF World Race Walking Challenge – the highest seasonal level of the sport – since the series was inaugurated in 2003.

The competition was first established in 1957 as a men's only road walking competition. After various distances ranging from 25 to 32 kilometres in its initial years, the race settled on a 30 km distance from 1960 onwards. A women's race was included from 1980 onwards. The women's races were initially over 10 kilometres in the early history of that competition. The event's inclusion in the IAAF World Challenge series saw it adopt the standard Olympic distance of 20 km for both the men's and women's races. The race has been held every year since 1957 with the sole exception of 1995, where it was postponed due to organisational issues.

The course for the race is a looped circuit directly in the centre of the city. The main route alternates along the parallel roads of Via Fratelli Bandiera and Via Giuseppe Rovani and the finishing point is a lap of the track and field stadium at the western end of the roads.

Past winners
Key:

Men's 30 km race era

First men's and women's races

IAAF-era (20 km)

Further reading
Redaelli, Daniele & Narducci, Fausto (2007). Sesto San Giovanni, una città in marcia. SEP.
La Torre, Antonio & Vernill, Gianluca (2009). La marcia femminile (1980-2009) e Sesto San Giovanni.

References

List of winners
Opuscolo. Sesto San Giovanni. Retrieved on 2013-05-06.

External links
Official website
1968 results

Racewalking competitions
World Athletics Race Walking Tour
Sport in Lombardy
Athletics competitions in Italy
Recurring sporting events established in 1957
1957 establishments in Italy
Spring (season) events in Italy